Want is the second Korean extended play (fourth overall) by South Korean singer Taemin. It was released on February 11, 2019, through SM Entertainment. The EP features seven tracks along with the title track and lead single, "Want". Want debuted at number one on the Gaon Album Chart.

Promotion
A minute-long concept film as well as teaser images for the cover, photoshoot and track listing of the EP were released from January 29 to February 2 through Shinee's social media, and Taemin's official website. A showcase hosted by Super Junior's Eunhyuk was held on February 11 at the Sangmyung Art Center in Seoul, where Taemin had the chance to perform and talk about the making of the release.

Accolades

Track listing

Charts

Weekly charts

Year-end charts

References

2019 EPs
Taemin EPs
IRiver EPs